Tsogt (mighty, Tsogtyn in the genitive form for patronymics) is a common part of Mongolian names.

People

 Tsogtyn Batbayar, the mayor of Ulaanbaatar between 2005 and 2007
 Tsogtyn Badamkhatan, an olympic archer from Mongolia
 Tsogt Badamjav, an Architect of Buryat descent (around 1900)
 Tsogt Khun Taij, a noble of the Khalkha-Mongols (1581–1637)

Places
 Several Sums (districts) in different Aimags (provinces) of Mongolia:
 Tsogt, Govi-Altai
 Tsogt-Ovoo, Ömnögovi
 Erdenetsogt, Bayankhongor
 Delgertsogt, Dundgovi
 Tsogttsetsii, Ömnögovi
 Bürentsogt Tungsten Mine, a mining location and settlement in eastern Mongolia

Other
 Tsogt Taij (film), a Mongolian movie about Tsogt Khun Taij